The 1999-00 Luxembourg Championship season was the fourth season of Luxembourg's hockey league. Three teams participated in the league regular season. The top team from the regular season, Lokomotiv Luxembourg, qualified for the final to play Tornado Luxembourg.

Regular season

Final
Tornado Luxembourg 10 - Lokomotiv Luxembourg 7

External links
Season on hockeyarchives.info

Luxembourg Championship
Luxembourg Championship (ice hockey) seasons